The Public Security of Monaco (() and ) is the national police force of the Principality of Monaco. It is subordinated from the Monegasque Department of Interior (Ministry of Interior) and consists of 515 men and women.  With 515 police officers for 35,000 people in 1.98 km2, Monaco has the largest police force and police presence in the world on both a per-capita and per-area basis. Its police includes a specialist unit which operates patrol and surveillance boats.

Organisation

The Directorate of Public Safety administers the Monegasque National Police force (officially the "Public Security of Monaco", but operating under the name "Police"). The Directorate was created on June 23, 1902, under the Department of the Interior.

The police force itself consists of several divisions each with several departments:
 The Criminal Police Division has three main departments, Criminal Investigations, Criminal Identity (co-ordinating with INTERPOL) and Resources.
 The Urban Police Division co-ordinates the activities of the uniformed police officers and also employs a number of units, including a General Police Brigade, Specialised Intervention Unit, Operational Command Centre and a Secretariat to the Police Court.
 The Administrative Police Division is responsible for the movement of foreign nationals through Monaco's borders, while the Division of the Administration and the Formation handles administration matters for the police force.
 The Maritime and Airport Police Divisions police the seas and skies of Monaco. The latter divisions both employ departments pertaining to air and sea rescue, water surveillance and the co-ordination of trans-border police operations with Monaco's neighbours. The Division of the Maritime and Airport Police (DPMA) itself was created on 16 August 1960 when security issues in the air and on the water were transferred to the control of the Director of Public Safety, and since 1961 the division has grown to consist of 8 officers and 27 civil servants. The Maritime Section controls and registers passengers in transit, is in charge of national waters surveillance, including submarine natural resources, and sea-rescue. The Trans-border and Heliport Control Section oversees border police missions.

They currently possess 3 patrol boats, which they share with the Compagnie des Carabiniers du Prince, and the Corps des Sapeurs-Pompiers.

Notes

 
Law of Monaco
National Central Bureaus of Interpol